Gammabaculovirus is a genus of viruses, in the family Baculoviridae. Hymenoptera serve as natural hosts. There are two species in this genus.

Taxonomy
The following species are assigned to the genus:
Neodiprion lecontei nucleopolyhedrovirus
Neodiprion sertifer nucleopolyhedrovirus

Structure
Viruses in Gammabaculovirus are enveloped. Genomes are circular, around 82-86kb in length. The genome codes for 90 proteins.

Life cycle
Viral replication is nuclear. Entry into the host cell is achieved by attachment of the viral glycoproteins to host receptors, which mediates endocytosis. Replication follows the dsDNA bidirectional replication model. DNA-templated transcription, with some alternative splicing mechanism is the method of transcription. The virus exits the host cell by nuclear pore export, and  existing in occlusion bodies after cell death and remaining infectious until finding another host. Hymenoptera serve as the natural host. Transmission routes are fecal-oral.

References

External links
 ICTV Report: Baculoviridae
 Viralzone: Gammabaculovirus

Baculoviridae
Virus genera